Parma Airport is located  northwest of Parma, a city in the Emilia-Romagna region of Italy. The airport was opened on 5 May 1991. It is also known as Giuseppe Verdi Airport or Parma "Giuseppe Verdi" Airport, named after Giuseppe Verdi.

Airlines and destinations

The following airlines operate regular scheduled flights to and from Parma:

Statistics

Ground transportation
Parma Airport is reachable in 7 minutes by car or by taxi. Otherwise, it is possible to reach the airport by bus route 6, operated by TEP Parma.

References

External links

 
 
 

Airports in Italy
Buildings and structures in Parma
Transport in Emilia-Romagna
Giuseppe Verdi